Le Kram is a town and commune in the Tunis Governorate of Tunisia. Situated between La Goulette, the port of Tunis, and Carthage, it opens onto the Gulf of Tunis to the east and the Lake of Tunis to the west. As of 2004 it had a population of 58,152. Before 2001, Le Kram was a municipal district within the municipality bordering La Goulette.

The original name of the city was Aga El Kram; it was Gallicised as Le Kram. The word kram in Tunisian Arabic refers to a fig tree or a fruit tree in general. Professor Mohamed El Aziz Ben Achour says of the town's founder:
"Mustapha Aga [...] living peacefully in his palace in the area of Carthage, in the midst of an extensive orchard with fig trees, the source of the name of the village which was established later in this location... "

Ahmad I ibn Mustafa, Bey of Tunis under the suzerainty of the Ottoman Empire, gave this orchard to Mustafa Aga, who served from 1837 to 1855 as war minister in the Kingdom of Tunis.

Under the French protectorate, Kram was home to many Europeans who built houses along the beach, some of them modest and others sumptuous. These  villas have been replaced by military training centers and the residential area of Kram Salammbo. One can still admire some of the gardens that surrounded the houses; the oldest were built in an Islamic Tunisian style, while the larger homes of the bourgeoisie were built in a purely Italian style, exemplified by La Carmencita, a small villa located on the street Sakiet Sidi Youssef (formerly Rue Jules Ferry). The town was developed mainly as a result of the opening of the Tunis-Goulette-Marsa or TGM railway combining the Khereddine line and the La Goulette-Carthage Salammbô line.

The center of Salammbô contains, among other curiosities, the remains of the port of Punic Carthage, the Tophet (or sacred area) of the ancient Carthaginians and the buildings of the Institute and Museum of Oceanography

See also 
List of cities in Tunisia

References

External links 
 

Populated places in Tunis Governorate
Communes of Tunisia
Tunisia geography articles needing translation from French Wikipedia